WWMT (channel 3) is a television station licensed to Kalamazoo, Michigan, United States, serving West Michigan as an affiliate of CBS and The CW. The station is owned by Sinclair Broadcast Group, and maintains studios on West Maple Street in Kalamazoo; its transmitter is located in northwest Yankee Springs Township on Chief Noonday Road/M-179 near Patterson Road.

History
The station signed on the air on June 1, 1950, as WKZO-TV (the call letters standing for "Kalamazoo"). It was West Michigan's second television station to debut after WLAV-TV (channel 7, now WOOD-TV channel 8) and was owned by broadcasting pioneer John Fetzer, along with WKZO radio, which Fetzer had owned since 1930. It carried programming from all four networks of the time: CBS, NBC, ABC and DuMont. However, it has always been a primary CBS affiliate owing to its radio sister's longtime affiliation with the CBS Radio Network.

From the start, WKZO-TV had reception problems due to the presence of WTMJ-TV across Lake Michigan in Milwaukee, also on analog VHF channel 3 until a shake-up of channels in Chicago, Kalamazoo, and Milwaukee in 1953. WTMJ moved to channel 4; WBBM-TV in Chicago to move from channel 4 to channel 2 as a condition of its purchase by CBS. Although WSBT-TV in South Bend, Indiana, signed on in 1952, WKZO-TV shared the southwestern part of its viewing area with WSBT-TV to the detriment of the latter until UHF reception was required on televisions. 

Channel 3 lost DuMont in 1956 after that network shut down. Soon afterward, the WKZO stations moved their operations to an old car dealership on West Maple Avenue in Kalamazoo, where the station remains based to this day. In 1960, Fetzer built a new  transmission tower near the northern edge of Gun Lake. The tower was located roughly halfway between Kalamazoo and Grand Rapids, allowing it to provide city-grade coverage of Grand Rapids while still being within  of Kalamazoo as required by Federal Communications Commission (FCC) regulations. Soon after channel 3 activated its new tower, the FCC collapsed West Michigan into one large television market. When the broadcast antenna was moved from Kalamazoo, WSBT became the default CBS channel for Berrien and Cass counties. WKZO then shared ABC with WOOD-TV until WZZM (channel 13) signed on in 1962.

Fetzer also owned the Detroit Tigers baseball team from 1956 to 1983. During this time, channel 3 frequently preempted prime time CBS programming for Tigers baseball games, including preseason exhibitions. In 1985, Fetzer retired and began selling off his vast broadcasting empire, which by this time included, among other holdings, WWTV in Cadillac, Michigan, and KOLN-TV in Lincoln, Nebraska. The FCC had grandfathered existing radio-television clusters when it barred common ownership of radio and television stations, but with Fetzer's announcement, WKZO-AM-TV lost its grandfathered protection. The Fetzer television stations were initially sold to Gillett Holdings. However, due to FCC ownership limits in effect at the time, WKZO-TV and KOLN-TV were spun off to Busse Broadcasting. On December 5, 1985, per a since-repealed FCC rule restricting TV and radio stations in the same market but with different ownership from sharing the same callsigns, Busse changed the station's call letters to the current WWMT (standing for "We're West Michigan Television"). In 1995, Granite Broadcasting acquired the station. Freedom Communications purchased WWMT in 1998 from Granite, along with sister station WLAJ in Lansing.

WWMT is the second longest-tenured CBS affiliate in Michigan (behind only WLNS-TV in Lansing, which signed on one month earlier); its logos have used the CBS logo since the mid-1990s. In 2005, a company-wide consolidation of operations at Freedom's stations resulted in the move of WLAJ's master control and most internal operations to WWMT's facilities. This left behind a skeleton crew of six people out of what began with 80 staffers in Lansing.

Freedom announced on November 2, 2011 that it would exit from television and sell its stations, including WWMT, to the Sinclair Broadcast Group. The group deal closed on April 2, 2012. As a result, WWMT and WLAJ joined Fox affiliate WSMH in Flint as two of the three Sinclair-owned television properties in the state of Michigan. On February 16, 2016, upon the completion of the merger between Schurz Communications and Gray Television, South Bend CBS affiliate WSBT-TV was spun-off to Sinclair in order to meet regulatory guidelines, allowing WWMT and WSBT to become sister operations to one another for the first time, outside of existing news video sharing agreements.

On May 8, 2017, Sinclair entered into an agreement to acquire Chicago-based Tribune Media – which has owned WXMI since 1996 – for $3.9 billion, plus the assumption of $2.7 billion in debt held by Tribune. Sinclair was precluded from acquiring WXMI directly, as both it and WWMT rank among the four highest-rated stations in the Grand Rapids–Kalamazoo–Battle Creek market in total day viewership and the market has too few independently owned full-power stations to permit legal duopolies in any event. On April 24, 2018, in an amendment to the Tribune acquisition through which it proposed the sale of certain stations to both independent and affiliated third-party companies to curry the DOJ's approval, Sinclair announced that it would sell WXMI and eight other stations – Sinclair-operated KOKH-TV in Oklahoma City, WRLH-TV in Richmond, WOLF-TV (along with LMA partners WSWB and WQMY) in Scranton/Wilkes-Barre, KDSM-TV in Des Moines and WXLV-TV in Greensboro/Winston-Salem/High Point, and Tribune-owned WPMT in Harrisburg – to Standard Media Group (an independent broadcast holding company formed by private equity firm Standard General to assume ownership of and absolve ownership conflicts involving the aforementioned stations) for $441.1 million.

Three weeks after the FCC's July 18 vote to have the deal reviewed by an administrative law judge amid "serious concerns" about Sinclair's forthrightness in its applications to sell certain conflict properties, on August 9, 2018, Tribune announced it would terminate the Sinclair deal, intending to seek other M&A opportunities. Tribune also filed a breach of contract lawsuit in the Delaware Chancery Court, alleging that Sinclair engaged in protracted negotiations with the FCC and the DOJ over regulatory issues, refused to sell stations in markets where it already had properties, and proposed divestitures to parties with ties to Sinclair executive chair David D. Smith that were rejected or highly subject to rejection to maintain control over stations it was required to sell. The termination of the Sinclair sale agreement places uncertainty for the future of Standard Media's purchases of WXMI and the other six Tribune- and Sinclair-operated stations included in that deal, which were predicated on the closure of the Sinclair–Tribune merger.

WWMT-DT2
On April 4, 2006, WWMT announced it would affiliate with The CW on a new second digital subchannel.

West Michigan is one of the largest television markets where The CW was not available through over-the-air analog broadcasts and WWMT is one of the few stations the new network was awarded that had not previously been affiliated with either The WB or UPN. WXSP joined MyNetworkTV when the network launched on September 5 and WWMT did the same with The CW when it began on September 18. From that date through early-December, WWMT-DT2 was branded as "West Michigan's CW"; it has since changed its branding to "The CW 7".

News operation

WWMT at present broadcasts 34½ hours of locally produced newscasts each week (with 5½ hours each weekday and 3½ hours each on Saturdays on Sundays). Originally, WKZO was Western Michigan's highest rated television station, but lost the lead to WZZM in the mid-1970s. It has been a solid runner-up, first to WZZM and later WOTV/WOOD-TV, for most of the time since then. For a time in the mid-1990s, even though most of WWMT's fellow CBS affiliates were in third place or worse, this station was very competitive with WZZM and WOOD-TV often resulting in close Nielsen ratings during sweeps periods.

Since its city of license is Kalamazoo, the station has traditionally had a focus in the southern areas of the market (Kalamazoo and Battle Creek). To assist in story gathering efforts in these areas, it operates a bureau on Michigan Avenue West in downtown Battle Creek. On two occasions, WWMT's existence prevented WOTV, the other major station based in the southern part of the market, from establishing a local news presence. WWMT also once operated a news bureau near Grand Rapids Police headquarters due to its secondary focus on the northern half of the market (Grand Rapids and Muskegon).

Veteran news anchor Tom VanHowe began filling-in for Jeff McAtee on July 28, 2008. McAtee was on active duty serving as a commander with the United States Navy Reserve. Marketing director Mark Bishop told the Grand Rapids Press that "McAtee will be active in the Navy Reserve for a year or two." In November 2008, VanHowe extended his contract to continue on WWMT until at least June 2009. He continued to co-anchor the station's 5, 5:30 and 6 p.m. newscasts on weeknights. Weekday morning news anchor Jeff Varner (participant in Survivor: The Australian Outback) moved to the weeknight broadcasts alongside Judy Markee.

On September 18, 2008, WWMT began producing a nightly prime time newscast at 10 p.m. on its CW-affiliated second digital subchannel. This established a third local news option in the timeslot, competing with Fox affiliate WXMI (channel 17)'s longer-established hour-long 10 p.m. newscast and MyNetworkTV affiliate WXSP's half-hour 10 p.m. newscast produced by WOOD-TV. Known as Newschannel 3 Live at 10 on The CW 7, this program currently airs for 30 minutes featuring a separate title opening, "CW 7" labeled microphones, and a "Newschannel 3 on CW 7" bug in the bottom right hand corner of the screen.
 
On April 17, 2009, WXMI became the first station in the market to begin broadcasting its local newscasts in high definition. Six months later, WOOD-TV upgraded its newscasts to 16:9 widescreen enhanced definition (WZZM would do the same sometime in late 2009). Although not truly high definition, broadcasts matched the aspect ratio of widescreen television sets. WWMT remained the last major station in Western Michigan with pillarboxed 4:3 standard definition newscasts until April 16, 2011 when it became the second station in the market to upgrade its local newscasts to full high definition (updated graphics were introduced along with the change).

After WLAJ's Lansing-based news operation was shut down on September 25, 2009, WWMT began producing a taped five-minute news and weather brief weeknights at 11 p.m. on that station. Known as ABC 3 News Update, regional and state coverage was presented in the show since WLAJ does not maintain any news personnel at its studios. There were also recorded local weather cut-ins seen on that station weekday mornings during Good Morning America. These productions were upgraded to high definition on April 16, 2011. After WLAJ came under the ownership of Shield Media on March 1, 2013, all news programming produced by WWMT ceased airing on the Lansing station and replaced by newscasts from WLNS-TV.

In June 2011, Andy Dominianni (who had previously served as the station's morning anchor in the late 1990s) and Kate Tillotson were appointed as anchors of the 5, 6 and 11 p.m. newscasts. On April 23, 2012, WWMT became the first station in the market to expand its weekday morning newscast to 4:30 a.m. On January 19, 2013, WWMT debuted weekend morning newscasts, airing for two hours from 6 to 8 a.m. on Saturdays and from 7 to 9 a.m. on Sundays.

Technical information

Subchannels
The station's digital signal is multiplexed:

Analog-to-digital conversion
WWMT shut down its analog signal, over VHF channel 3, on June 12, 2009, as part of the federally mandated transition from analog to digital television. The station's digital signal moved from its pre-transition VHF channel 2 to channel 8 (which was formerly used for the analog signal of WOOD-TV), using PSIP to display the WWMT's virtual channel as 3 on digital television receivers.

See also
Channel 3 virtual TV stations in the United States
Channel 7 branded TV stations in the United States
Channel 8 digital TV stations in the United States

References

Sources
WWMT TV Channel 3 (June 13 2005). Michigan's Radio and TV Broadcast Guide.

External links

WWMT-DT2 "CW 7"

CBS network affiliates
Comet (TV network) affiliates
Television channels and stations established in 1950
1950 establishments in Michigan
Sinclair Broadcast Group
WMT
Companies based in Kalamazoo, Michigan